Hallville Historic and Archaeological District is a historic district in Exeter, Rhode Island.

The historic district contains the remains of 19th-century textile mills and associated structures. The only standing structure in the district is a late 18th-century house at 239 Hallville Rd. The home is known as the Dawley House, for John C. Dawley, a mill owner who once lived there. The district was added to the National Register of Historic Places on December 5, 1980.

See also
National Register of Historic Places listings in Washington County, Rhode Island

References

Historic districts in Washington County, Rhode Island
Exeter, Rhode Island
Historic districts on the National Register of Historic Places in Rhode Island